Aleksandr Yuryevich Shchukin (5 January 1969 – 18 March 2000) was a Russian professional footballer.

Club career
He made his professional debut in the Soviet Second League in 1987 for FC Lokomotiv Gorky.

Death
He was killed in 2000 in a car crash near Arzamas.

References

1969 births
Sportspeople from Nizhny Novgorod
2000 deaths
Road incident deaths in Russia
Soviet footballers
Russian footballers
Association football midfielders
FC Lokomotiv Nizhny Novgorod players
FC Kuban Krasnodar players
FC Neftekhimik Nizhnekamsk players
FC Mordovia Saransk players
Russian Premier League players